Caledonian is a geographical term used to refer to places, species, or items in or from Scotland, or particularly the Scottish Highlands. It derives from Caledonia, the Roman name for the area of modern Scotland.

Caledonian is also used to refer to places or people in or from New Caledonia.

Caledonian may also refer to:

Transport 
 Caledonian (ship), several ships with the name
 Caledonian (locomotive), an early locomotive of the Liverpool and Manchester Railway
 The Caledonian, discontinued British passenger train
 Caledonian Airways, former Scottish airline
 Caledonian Canal, between Inverness and Fort William, Scotland
 Caledonian Railway, former Scottish railway company
 Caledonian Railway (Brechin), preserved steam railway
 Caledonian Road (disambiguation), the name of several places in London, England
 Caledonian Sleeper, a sleeper train service in Scotland

Sports 
 Caledonian F.C., former football club from Inverness
 Inverness Caledonian Thistle F.C., football club created in 1994 by the merger of Caledonian F.C. and Inverness Thistle F.C.
 Caledonian Stadium, football stadium in Inverness opened in 1996, home ground of the above
 Caledonian Ground, sports venue in Dunedin, New Zealand
 The Caledonian Cup, a tournament held each year by Scottish Pro Wrestling

Other uses 
 Caledonians, an ancient tribal confederation
 Caledonian orogeny, a geological event
 Caledonian Brewery, in Edinburgh, Scotland
 Caledonian Forest, the native woodland of Highland Scotland
 Caledonian Hall, a historic building in Holyoke, Massachusetts
 Caledonian-Record, a newspaper published in Vermont, USA
 Glasgow Caledonian University, in Glasgow, Scotland

It is also used by Scottish institutions or societies around the world, or by groups with Scottish ancestry. For example, the Caledonian Club in London.

See also 
 Caledonia
 Caledonians
 Caledonians (disambiguation)